Over You is a song written by Austin Roberts and Bobby Hart for the 1983 film Tender Mercies. It was nominated for an Academy Award in the category of Best Original Song.

References 

1983 songs
Songs written for films